Robert Florentino (born 14 June 1997) is a male judoka from the Dominican Republic.

He is the 2021 Pan American Judo Championships gold medallist in the - 90 kg category and represented the Dominican Republic at the 2020 Summer Olympics.

References

External links
 

1997 births
Living people
Dominican Republic male judoka
Judoka at the 2020 Summer Olympics
Olympic judoka of the Dominican Republic
Place of birth missing (living people)
20th-century Dominican Republic people
21st-century Dominican Republic people